Annika Jakobsen (born 25 February 1997) is a Danish handballer who plays for Silkeborg-Voel KFUM.

References

1997 births
Living people
People from Horsens
Danish female handball players
Sportspeople from the Central Denmark Region